José Giral y Pereira (22 October 1879 – 23 December 1962) was a Spanish politician, who served as the 75th Prime Minister of Spain during the Second Spanish Republic.

Life
Giral was born in Santiago de Cuba. He had degrees in Chemistry and Pharmacy from the University of Madrid. In 1905 he became professor of chemistry in the University of Salamanca. He founded Acción Republicana with Manuel Azaña. During the dictatorship of Miguel Primo de Rivera he conspired against the regime, and was imprisoned three times. When the Second Republic was declared, he was named director of the Universidad Complutense de Madrid and advisor of State. Between 1931 and 1933 he served as Minister of the Navy.

After the failure of Diego Martínez Barrio to form a government to restrain the military revolt of 17 July 1936, Azaña ordered Giral to form a new government constituted exclusively by republicans. This 133rd Prime Minister government lasted from 19 July to 4 September 1936. Then, with the fall of Talavera de la Reina and the Army of Morocco within reach of Madrid, Giral was forced to cede power to Francisco Largo Caballero.

After the end of the Spanish Civil War he went to France, then to Mexico. In 1945 he succeeded Juan Negrín as prime minister of the Spanish Republican government in Exile until 1947.
He died in Mexico.

He married María Luisa González y de la Calle.

Cabinet
Members of Giral's cabinet of 19 July 1936 – 4 September 1936 were:

References

Sources

1879 births
1962 deaths
People from Santiago de Cuba
Republican Action (Spain) politicians
Republican Left (Spain) politicians
Prime Ministers of Spain
Foreign ministers of Spain
Members of the Congress of Deputies of the Second Spanish Republic
Spanish people of the Spanish Civil War (Republican faction)
Exiles of the Spanish Civil War in Mexico
Complutense University of Madrid alumni
Academic staff of the Complutense University of Madrid
Academic staff of the University of Salamanca
Exiled Spanish politicians
Government ministers during the Second Spanish Republic
Migrants from Spanish Cuba to Spain